Nicolaas Rockox (1560–1640), was a mayor of Antwerp. He was a close personal friend and important patron of Peter Paul Rubens.  His residence in Antwerp is now a museum known as the Rockox House.  He was knighted by Archduke Albert and Isabella, the Governor General of the Southern Netherlands.

Family 
Nicolaas Rockox was the oldest son of Adriaan II and Isabella van Olmen.  His parents were both scions of prominent families.  Rockox was a nephew of John III van de Werve, Lord of Hovorst and a first cousin of Lancelot II of Ursel, mayor of Antwerp. After his father died when Nicolaas was only 10, his mother and other family members took care to ensure that he and his two younger brothers received an advanced education. After schooling in Antwerp, he studied at the universities of Leuven and Paris. He finished his studies at the University of Douai where he graduated in law on 24 August 1584.

In 1589, in Antwerp Cathedral, he married Adriana Perez (1568–1619), daughter of the rich Spanish merchant Luis Perez (1532–1601) and Maria van Berchem. He died without children in the Rockox House.

Career 
Rockox became a member of the civic militia of Antwerp and defended the city in the service of Philips of Marnix, Lord of Saint-Aldegonde when Alexander Farnese, Duke of Parma, attacked Antwerp in 1584. Rockox studied the fortifications from Jean Errard, Bar-le-Duc and had the outer walls of Antwerp repaired and improved.

In 1590, he was knighted by the Archdukes Albert and Isabella. He was put on the list of honours when their Joyous Entry took place.

In 1603 Rockox bought the house named Gulden Rinck and developed it into his main residence, now known as the Rockox House. It housed an important collection of art and of curiosities, famous in his own time. His collection included a Samson and Delilah painted for him by his friend Rubens. After 1608 the friendship between them was very close. Rockox commissioned several paintings from him, including The Incredulity of Saint Thomas. Other friends of Rockox include Abraham Ortelius, who taught him the art of numismatics, and the young Anthony van Dyck, who painted several portraits for him.

Rockox served several terms as mayor of Antwerp. He died in the Rockox House and was buried in the church of the Recollect convent, where he had had a private chapel built for his deceased wife in 1619. Because he had no children, his property was given to the poor, in devotion. During his life Rockox spent an important part of his private fortune to benefit the poor. He commanded that a public reserve of grain be prepared for the poor in case of war or siege. He paid 45,300 florins for this from his private fortune. After his death his famous collection of artworks spread to other collections worldwide.

Patronage 
Rockox commissioned multiple paintings from Peter Paul Rubens. Some of these commissions were for the public, while others were for his private residence. Among those he commissioned for the public included Adoration of the Magi for the Antwerp City Hall, Descent from the Cross for the city's Arquebusiers' Guild's altar, and Doubting Thomas for Rockox's chapel. Rockox's private commissions from Rubens included Samson and Delilah. At the time of his death, Rockox had 87 works in his personal collection. Other artists represented within this collection included Anthony van Dyck, Frans Snyders, Jan van Eyck, and Pieter Bruegel. After his death, his art collection was sold publicly.

References

Mayors of Antwerp, Belgium
Flemish nobility
Politicians of the Spanish Netherlands
Peter Paul Rubens
Counter-Reformation
Art collectors from Antwerp
1560 births
1640 deaths